The 1900 Princeton Tigers football team represented Princeton University in the 1900 college football season. The team finished with an 8–3 record.  The Tigers won their first eight games by a combined score of 159 to 10, but then lost the last three games of the season against Cornell, Columbia and Yale. No Princeton players received first-team honors on the 1900 College Football All-America Team.

Schedule

References

Princeton
Princeton Tigers football seasons
Princeton Tigers football